Margarita Nesterova (born 20 September 1989, Dushanbe) is a Russian swimmer. At the 2012 Summer Olympics, she competed for the national team in the Women's 4 x 100 metre freestyle relay, finishing in 10th place in the heats, failing to reach the final.

References

Living people
Olympic swimmers of Russia
Swimmers at the 2012 Summer Olympics
Russian female freestyle swimmers
Universiade medalists in swimming
1989 births
Sportspeople from Dushanbe
Universiade bronze medalists for Russia
Medalists at the 2015 Summer Universiade
Medalists at the 2013 Summer Universiade